The McRae House is a historic house at 1113 East 3rd Street in Hope, Arkansas.  This two story brick house was designed by Charles L. Thompson and built c. 1917.  It is a restrained Prairie style design, with a relatively simple main block, whose entrance is highlighted by a small porch supported by six Tuscan columns on brick plinths.  The porch has curved beams, and the columns are echoed in pilasters on the facade.

The house was listed on the National Register of Historic Places in 1982.

See also
National Register of Historic Places listings in Hempstead County, Arkansas

References

Houses on the National Register of Historic Places in Arkansas
Prairie School architecture in Arkansas
Houses completed in 1917
Houses in Hempstead County, Arkansas
National Register of Historic Places in Hempstead County, Arkansas
1917 establishments in Arkansas